"Wake Up" is a song by Canadian rock band Three Days Grace, from their debut studio album Three Days Grace. The song was released on January 10, 2005 as the fourth and final single from the album. It was released exclusively in Canada. The radio edit version changes the original line, "you're not drunk enough to fuck" to "you're just not drunk enough to talk."

Background
Lead singer Adam Gontier talked about the song "Wake Up" during an interview. He said, "We kind of wrote that song together as a band. The other guys in the band have gone through quite a few relationships, and I've been through a couple. Really that song's just about wanting to get a second chance at a relationship that has gone pretty bad." The track runs at 154 BPM and is in the key of A major.

The band performed an acoustic version of the song on MTV in 2004. The acoustic version was included in their Rolling Stone Original EP and a live version was included in their Three Days Grace DVD album.

Critical reception
AXS.com listed "Wake Up" as one of the "top 10 best Three Days Grace songs." Patricia Jones of AXS stated, "Instrumentally this song is beautiful. The melodies are well orchestrated and the heavy guitar help balance out the lightness of the rest, but it’s the lyrics that cause some conflict." She praised the song for being an "easy" and "entrenching" track and how "the lyrics are in sharp contrast to the ease of the music."

Personnel

Three Days Grace
 Adam Gontier – lead vocals, guitars 
 Brad Walst – bass guitar
 Neil Sanderson – drums, backing vocals

Production
 Michael Baskette – engineer
 Jay Baumgardner – mixing 
 Gavin Brown – producer
 Mark Kiczula – assistant engineer
 George Marino – mastering
 Darren Mora – assistant engineer
 Mike Lapierre – assistant engineer
 Krisjan Leslie – additional engineer
 Damien Shannon – assistant engineer
 Alley Trela – assistant engineer
 German Villacorta – assistant engineer

Charts

Release history

References

Three Days Grace songs
2003 songs
2005 singles
Song recordings produced by Gavin Brown (musician)
Songs written by Adam Gontier